Marshall Thomas Edwards (October 19, 1915 - November 28, 2000) was an American football Fullback for the Brooklyn Dodgers for one game in 1943. He also played for the Charlotte Clippers in 1941 and in 1946.

References

1915 births
2000 deaths
Brooklyn Dodgers (NFL) players
Players of American football from North Carolina
Wake Forest Demon Deacons football players